Pleione forrestii is a species of flowering plant in the orchid family, Orchidaceae. It is endemic to Yunnan in China.

It was named in honour of George Forrest (1873-1932).

References

External links

forrestii
Endangered plants
Orchids of Yunnan
Taxonomy articles created by Polbot